Fangio Buyse (born 27 September 1974) is a Belgian football midfielder and manager. Married with Nikolina Stevic and father of  Lara Buyse

Career

Player
He played with Australian Aurelio Vidmar in K.S.V. Waregem and subsequently moved to Greece to play for Niki Volou, Athinaikos, Kerkyra, Agios Dimitrios and Acharnaikos. In 2006 he went to Cyprus to play for Doxa Katokopias for two seasons, and then from summer 2008 he played for APOP Kinyras Peyias. At APOP Kinyras Peyias he helped them win their first Cypriot Cup title in 2009 and scored in the final against AEL Limassol.

Manager
In his first year as a player/manager in 2012–13 he managed to get AEK Kouklia F.C. promoted for the first time in the team's history to the Cypriot First Division. In July 2013 he moved to AC Omonia Nicosia , first as coach of the U-21 team and later in a double role also as Assistant-coach after the team sacked Toni Savevski. In a 21 month period he worked together with 3 headcoaches; Nenad Starovlah, Miguel Angel Lotina and Costas Kaiafas. He also was care-taker for Omonia's win over EN Paralimni on 5 January 2014. After 3.5 years in Omonia Nicosia AC he moved back to Niki Volou (his first team as a player in Greece), and started first as technical director of the academy, as he was also in his last year in Omonia. Then in 2017-18 as the first team manager he won the local Thessaly Cup, and also took the team to the Football League II Cup final. In 2018-19 he became manager of Olympiakos Nicosia. When he started they were in last position with 0 points, but he managed to get them promoted to the first division. After this successful season he decided to leave Cyprus. He was close to signing for FC Lugano but at the last moment the deal fell through, so he then joined newly promoted Blue Boys Muhlenbach and he managed to keep them in the BGL League.
Due to Corona and the stop of the Championship in Luxembourg he moved to his home country to join KMSK Deinze. After a 1 year stay he received an offer from Saudi Professional League Abha Club to become technical director.
At his arrival on 15 October the team was in the last place with only 4 points in 7 games.

Honours

Player
KSV Waregem
Belgian second division: 1994–95

Athinaikos
Greece second division: 2000–01

APOP Kinyras
Cypriot Cup: 2008–09

Coach
Aek kouklia FC
Promotion to Premier League: 2013
Omonia Nicosia
 Qualification round Europa league: 2014-2015-2016
Nikivolou
 Thessalia Cup 2017
 Qualification Greek Cup groups 2018
Olympiakos Nicosia
Promotion to Premier League: 2019

Managerial statistics

References

External links
http://www.uefa.com/teamsandplayers/players/player=250008747/profile/index.html
http://www.nieuwsblad.be/sportwereld/cnt/DMF20130515_00584084

1974 births
Living people
Belgian footballers
Belgian expatriate footballers
Niki Volos F.C. players
Athinaikos F.C. players
A.O. Kerkyra players
Doxa Katokopias FC players
APOP Kinyras FC players
AEP Paphos FC players
Belgian Pro League players
Challenger Pro League players
Cypriot First Division players
Cypriot Second Division players
Expatriate footballers in Greece
Expatriate footballers in Cyprus
AEK Kouklia F.C. players
Belgian football managers
Niki Volos F.C. managers
FC Blue Boys Muhlenbach managers
Belgian expatriate football managers
K.M.S.K. Deinze players
Akritas Chlorakas players
Association football midfielders
People from Deinze
Footballers from East Flanders